Felicia D. Henderson (born April 18, 1961) is an American television producer, screenwriter, comic books writer and a director of music videos and television episodes. She has worked on Moesha, Sister, Sister, Soul Food, and Fringe, also played in a movie with Whitney Houston.

Personal life
Henderson was born on April 18, 1961. She grew up in Pasadena, California, where she currently resides.  She is one of eight siblings, including a brother who works as a reality show editor. Henderson currently resides in Pasadena, California. She has always had a love for writing and describes herself as a "researchaholic."  After graduating from the University of California, Los Angeles with a Bachelor of Arts degree in Psycho-Biology, she spent five years in business, and later attended the University of Georgia where she obtained an MBA in corporate finance and non-profit management.

She also holds an MFA from UCLA (2004) and is a PhD Candidate in Media Studies, also at UCLA.

She is also a Diamond Life member of Delta Sigma Theta sorority, the Writers Guild of America, the Directors Guild of America, and the Television Academy of Arts and Sciences.

Career

After working as a creative associate at NBC, Henderson realized she wanted to become a writer, and soon became an apprentice on the sitcom Family Matters, and on The Fresh Prince of Bel Air two years later. She co-produced Moesha and Sister, Sister, and developed the TV series Soul Food for television. It became the longest running drama in television history to star a black cast, and earned several NAACP Image Awards.

She and three of her friends, Mara Brock Akil, Gina Prince-Bythewood, and Sara Finney-Johnson endowed the Four Sisters Scholarship in Screenwriting, Directing, and Animation to support students interested in projects depicting the African American experience. She is currently a PhD candidate in the school's Cinema and Media Studies program.

Henderson worked as a co-executive producer for the teen drama series Gossip Girl. She also served as a co-executive producer on the first season of the science-fiction television series Fringe, before leaving to begin as a writer on the DC Comics series Teen Titans, Static Shock, as well as other projects.

Her television drama credits include "Marvel's The Punisher" and "The Quad."

Filmography
 Family Matters, writer and story editor (1994-1996)
 The Fresh Prince of Bel-Air, writer (1995)
 Moesha, writer and co-producer (1996-1997)
 Sister, Sister, writer, co-executive producer, and supervising producer  (1997-1998)
 Movie Stars, writer and consulting producer (2000)
 Soul Food, creator, writer, director and executive producer (2000-2003)
 Everybody Hates Chris, writer and consulting producer (2006)
 Gossip Girl, writer and co-executive producer (2007-2008)
 Fringe, writer and co-executive producer (2008-2009)
 Reed Between the Lines, writer and executive producer (2012-2013)
 The Quad, co-creator, executive producer (2016-2018)
 Marvel's The Punisher, writer and co-executive producer (2017-2018)
 First Kill, showrunner, executive producer (2022-)

References

Sources

External links
 

1965 births
Living people
African-American television directors
American television directors
Television producers from California
American women television producers
American television writers
Place of birth missing (living people)
American women television directors
University of California, Los Angeles alumni
American women television writers
20th-century American screenwriters
20th-century American women writers
21st-century American screenwriters
21st-century American women writers
Writers from Pasadena, California
Screenwriters from California
20th-century African-American women writers
20th-century African-American writers
21st-century African-American women writers
21st-century African-American writers
African-American television writers